In late morning on 4 April 2020, a knife attack occurred in Romans-sur-Isère, Auvergne-Rhône-Alpes, France, resulting in the death of two people and the wounding of five others. The attacker, Abdallah Ahmed-Osman, a 33-year old Sudanese refugee, was charged with terrorist crimes.

Attack
The attacker entered a tobacco shop, where he stabbed the two owners and a customer, wounding them; he went on to a butcher's shop, where he stole a knife and killed a customer. He then killed another man, the owner of a local theatre who died shielding his twelve-year-old son, and then wounded two people waiting in line outside a bakery.

The suspect was a 33-year-old Sudanese man who had obtained refugee status and a 10-year visa in 2017. According to Arabic-speaking witnesses, he shouted "Allah Akbar" when he launched his attack and, at the time of his arrest, kneeled down and recited the Shahada, the Muslim profession of faith. A terrorism investigation was launched. Searches at his home revealed handwritten notes complaining about living in a "country of disbelievers". On 8 April, he was indicted for "assassinations and attempted assassinations in connection with a terrorist group".

The attack occurred during the national lockdown due to the COVID-19 pandemic in France.

See also 
 Paris police headquarters stabbing
 2017 London Bridge attack
 2016 Nice truck attack
 November 2015 Paris attacks
 2019 Lyon bombing
 2019 Lyon stabbings
 Murder of Samuel Paty

References

21st century in Auvergne-Rhône-Alpes
Islamic terrorism in France
Islamic terrorist incidents in 2020
Terrorist incidents in France in 2020
Terrorist incidents involving knife attacks
April 2020 crimes in Europe
April 2020 events in France
Crime in Auvergne-Rhône-Alpes
Drôme
Stabbing attacks in 2020
Stabbing attacks in France